Oenogenes is a genus of snout moths. It was described by Edward Meyrick in 1884.

Species
 Oenogenes congrualis
 Oenogenes fugalis (C. Felder, R. Felder & Rogenhofer, 1875)

References

Endotrichini
Pyralidae genera
Taxa named by Edward Meyrick